Nycteliini is a tribe of darkling beetles in the subfamily Pimeliinae of the family Tenebrionidae. There are about 12 genera in Nycteliini, found in the Neotropics.

Genera
These genera belong to the tribe Nycteliini

 Auladera Solier, 1836
 Callyntra Solier, 1836
 Entomobalia Flores & Triplehorn, 2002
 Entomoderes Solier, 1836
 Epipedonota Solier, 1836
 Gyriosomus Guérin-Méneville, 1834
 Mitragenius Solier, 1836
 Nyctelia Berthold, 1827
 Patagonogenius Flores, 1999
 Pilobalia Burmeister, 1875
 Psectrascelis Solier, 1836
 Scelidospecta Kulzer, 1954

References

Further reading

 
 

Tenebrionoidea